Joël Godeau (born 6 August 1945) is a French ice hockey player. He competed in the men's tournament at the 1968 Winter Olympics.

References

1945 births
Living people
Olympic ice hockey players of France
Ice hockey players at the 1968 Winter Olympics
People from Saint-Gervais, Isère
Sportspeople from Isère